WLB may refer to:

Organisations
 Welsh Language Board, a former UK statutory body
 Wiener Lokalbahnen, an Austrian railway company
 Württembergische Landesbibliothek, the Württemberg State Library, in Stuttgart, Germany

Other uses
 Radio K, Minnesota, US, by former callsign
 USCG seagoing buoy tender, by hull classification symbol
 Wiffle League Ball, a wiffle ball league
 Work–life balance, a concept referring to proper prioritizing between career and personal life development
 Weakside linebacker, a defensive position in American and Canadian football
 What Lies Beneath (Tarja album), an album from Finnish singer Tarja